Belle Isle may refer to:

Places

Canada
 Belle Isle (Newfoundland and Labrador), an island between Labrador and Newfoundland
 Strait of Belle Isle, in which the island is situated

England
 Belle Isle, Leeds, West Yorkshire
 Belle Isle (Windermere), an island in Lake District, Cumbria

France
 Belle Isle (Brittany)

Ireland
 Belle Isle Castle, a castle in County Fermanagh, Northern Ireland

United States
 Belle Isle, Florida, an inland town in central Florida
 Belle Isle (Miami Beach), an artificial island in Biscayne Bay
 Belle Isle, a small island in Isle Royale National Park, Michigan
 Belle Isle Marsh Reservation, parkland near Boston
 Belle Isle Park (Michigan), in Detroit, Michigan
 Belle Isle State Park (Virginia), in Lancaster, Virginia
 Belle Isle (Lancaster, Virginia), a historic plantation house
 Belle Isle (Richmond, Virginia), an island and public park in the James River

People 
 Charles Louis Auguste Fouquet, duc de Belle-Isle (1684–1761), French general and statesman
 Louis Charles Armand Fouquet, chevalier de Belle-Isle (1693–1647), French general and brother of the former

Music 
 Belle Isle, a 2009 album by MoZella
 "Belle Isle", a song by Bob Dylan from Self Portrait

See also 
 Bell Island (disambiguation)
 Belle Île
 Belleisle (disambiguation)
 Belle Island (disambiguation)
 Detroit Belle Isle Grand Prix, an IndyCar Series race weekend held at Belle Isle in Detroit, Michigan